Bonby Priory was a priory in Lincolnshire, England. St. Andrews Church is all that remains of Bonby Priory, which was a Benedictine alien priory of St. Fromond Priory from 1199 to 1403. The priory was then rented to Beauvale Abbey and the church became parochial.

References

Monasteries in Lincolnshire